Apocynum, commonly known as dogbane or Indian hemp, is a small genus of the flowering plant family Apocynaceae. Its name comes from Ancient Greek  , from   "away" and   "dog", referring to dogbane (Cionura erecta), which was used to poison dogs. The genus is native to North America, temperate Asia, and southeastern Europe.

Apocynum species are used as food plants by the larvae of some Lepidoptera species, including the mouse moth and the queen butterfly.

Uses
Apocynum cannabinum was used as a source of fiber by Native Americans. Apocynum venetum is used as an herbal tea in China. Dogbane contains cymarin, a cardiotonic agent formerly used to treat cardiac arrhythmia in humans.

Species
Almost 300 names have been proposed in the genus for species, subspecies, and forms. , only the following five species and hybrids are currently recognized, with several subspecies and varieties accepted for A. androsaemifolium and A. venetum (see their respective species pages).

 Apocynum androsaemifolium L. – Canada, United States, northeastern Mexico
 Apocynum cannabinum L. – Canada, United States
 Apocynum × floribundum Greene (a hybrid of A. androsaemifolium and A. cannabinum) – Canada, United States, northern Mexico
 Apocynum pictum Schrenk – China, Mongolia, Kazakhstan, Kyrgyzstan, Tajikistan
 Apocynum venetum L. – southeastern Europe and Asia

References

External links

Apocyneae
Apocynaceae genera
Taxa named by Carl Linnaeus